LOC Kargil is a 2003 Indian Hindi-language historical war film based on the Kargil War fought between India and Pakistan, produced and directed by J. P. Dutta under his banner "J. P. Films". The film features an ensemble cast of Bollywood stars and music composed by Aadesh Shrivastava and Anu Malik, with the former composing the score and the latter composing the songs.

The film is based on the Indian Army's successful Operation Vijay that was launched in May 1999 in the wake of the Pakistani intrusion and occupation of the strategic heights in the Kargil sector to flush out the Pakistani intruders from the Indian side of the Line of Control (LoC). Upon release, LOC received a mixed response critically and commercially flopped at the box office. With a running time of 255 minutes, it is one of the longest Indian films ever made and fifth in terms of running time.

Plot 

The film opens with a dramatic shot of an Indian soldier's wireless set chirping frantic commands from one of the army bases, calling a patrol to report in while the radio operator lies dead in the snow. After frantic attempts from battalions to locate their lost patrols, the Indian Army HQ in Jammu and Kashmir decides to deploy more troops. Lts. Saurabh Kalia and Amit Bharadhwaj are sent on reconnaissance patrols along the Line of Control (LoC). Lt. Kalia's patrol is wiped out while Lt. Bharadhwaj's patrol suffers heavy casualties but manages to return to their base. Pakistani forces begin shelling across the LoC, targeting National Highway 1A (NH-1A). The Indian Army decides to deploy more troops but suffers a rude shock when the company and even battalion-sized patrols are beaten back by the Pakistani intruders who have occupied peaks around the Mushkoh Valley, Kargil, Dras, Kaksar and Batalik. After these terrible reverses, the decision is taken to go ahead with maximum mobilization and move the army's best fighting units into the area of operations. However, orders from Delhi are that Indian soldiers are barred from crossing the LoC during their operations. Most mobilized battalions are completely unaware of the nature and size of the threat. Thus the rationale behind maximum mobilization is questioned by all the battalion commanders.

The first unit deployed is the 1st battalion, 11 Gorkha Rifles (1/11 GR), who are specialists in high-altitude warfare. 1/11 GR's commanding officer is Col. Lalit Rai, and the battalion has the charismatic and brave Capt. Manoj Pandey leading one of its platoons. Subsequently, the 18th battalion, The Grenadiers (18 Grenadiers), which was in the Kashmir Valley guarding against terrorist infiltration, are deployed in Kargil. The battalion is led by Col. Khushal Thakur, and among the officers and soldiers are men like Lt. Col. R. Vishwanathan, Maj. Rajesh Adhikari, Lt. Balwan Singh, Capt. Sachin Nimbalkar, and Grens. Yogendra Singh Yadav and Manoj Bajpai). 18 Grenadiers are followed by the 17th battalion, Jat Regiment (17 Jat) led by Col. Umesh Singh Bawa with Capt. Anuj Nayyar leading one of its units. 17 Jat is followed by the 13th battalion, Jammu & Kashmir Rifles (13 JAK Rif) commanded by Lt. Col. Yogesh Kumar Joshi with Capt. Vikram Batra leading one of its units. Other battalions are subsequently inducted into the theatre of conflict. The Indian Air Force launches photographic reconnaissance missions in order to identify the intruders.

The first assault was carried out by the 1/11 GR advance platoon, led by Lt. Pandey, who first captured Yaldar village and linked up with a beleaguered and severely mauled company from the 3rd battalion, Punjab Regiment (3 Punjab). JCOs from 3 Punjab reveal that earlier patrols from 3 Punjab and 16 Grenadiers had gone missing in the Kukarthang sector. Lt. Pandey's platoon followed the patrol paths and launched an attack on Kukarthang post, a very heavily defended enemy position supported by mortar units and artillery batteries on the Pakistani side of the LoC. The Gorkhas captured Kukarthang after taking 9 casualties. It is later revealed that the size of the infiltration was much larger than previously thought. Indian Army planners believe that approximately 3,000 members of the Pakistan Army's Northern Light Infantry were involved.

The second battle was at the strategic Tololing mountain, which sits astride National Highway 1D, the main supply route for the entire northern Kashmir sector, including Siachen and Leh. 18 Grenadiers linked up with the severely beaten 16 Grenadiers and got the first-hand knowledge of the situation. A company from 18 Grenadiers, led by Maj. Adhikari, attacks Tololing. The company is held up midway due to heavy fog; it waits for clear weather. Intense enemy shelling occurs while the men are resting, causing panic and casualties. They try to move up the mountain but are pushed down by heavy small arms fire from intruders who are well entrenched atop the feature. Subsequent attacks from the Indians are stifled by stiff resistance, and in the absence of artillery support, Maj. Adhikari and Lt. Col. Vishwanathan are killed. 18 Grenadiers make a total of 4 attempts to recapture Tololing but are repeatedly beaten back.

Meanwhile, a unit from 17 Jat led by Maj. Deepak Rampal captures a Pakistani mortar position. They subsequently liberate an important peak, but suffer casualties. Col. Bawa tasks them to capture Pt. 4850.

18 Grenadiers are relieved by the 2nd battalion, Rajputana Rifles (2 Raj Rif), commanded by Col. Ravindranath, which moves in with an artillery battery of 110 mm field artillery and acclimatized troops. They launch a multi-pronged attack with artillery support which ends in success but at a heavy cost, with Capt. Vijayant Thapar, Maj. Padmapani Acharya and Maj. Vivek Gupta was killed. All this happens while 13 JAK Rif stands by in case 2 Raj Rif fails. Meanwhile, the Indian Air Force launches combat sorties (Operation Safed Sagar) and bombs enemy positions.

13 JAK Rif is blooded at Rocky Knob, where they take the field after suffering heavy casualties. They follow it up with another victory at Point 5140, where Lt. Batra distinguishes himself by taking the south face of the peak without any casualties and is promoted to captain.

The decisive phase of the war arrives. 18 Grenadiers are assigned to take Tiger Hill, 17 Jat to Three Pimple Complex feature, 1/11 GR to Khalubar Ridge, and 13 JAK Rif to Point 4875. After a heavy artillery barrage, 18 Grenadiers take Tiger Hill, spearheaded by a daring stealth attack by the elite Ghatak section, which includes both Grens. Yogendra Singh Yadav. However, only one member of the section, Gren. Yadav (Manoj Bajpai), survives (despite being shot several times) to link up with the rest of the battalion. 17 Jat suffers heavy casualties with Capt. Nayyar and several others were killed and injured but are able to secure Three Pimple Complex.

1/11 GR link up with 22 Grenadiers at the base of Khalubar Ridge after braving an intense creeping barrage of artillery. Lt. Pandey somehow keeps the sagging morale of the weary unit up till the battalion begins its attack. The plans go awry when Col. Rai, is injured by machine gunfire. Lt. Pandey volunteers to take out the bunkers which are holding up the attack. The machine guns are taken out, but Lt. Pandey and his platoon sergeant Hav. Bhim Bahadur are killed.

The last battle is fought by 13 JAK Rif at Bunker Complex. The unit gets split up – Capt. Batra is sent to link up with Capt. Nagappa has captured one bunker and is surrounded by the enemy. Batra links up with Nagappa but is pinned down by the heavy enemy fire. He single-handedly takes out two bunkers but is mortally wounded. 13 JAK Rif pursues the fleeing enemy to the LOC, but Col. Y. K. Joshi stops due to orders not to cross it. After that, the 18 Grenadiers, 8 Sikhs,s and 1/11 Gorkha Rifles launch their final attack on Tiger Hill, and they manage to capture it.17 Jat captures Three Pimple Complex. 13 J&K Rifles capture Point 4875. 1/11 GR capture Khalubar Ridge. Finally, India declares Operation Vijay on 14 July 1999 a success.

Cast

Production
Just like J. P. Dutta's previous war movie Border, the Indian military provided technical and material assistance during the production and filming of LOC Kargil. Weapons depicted were those used in the Kargil war, like different variants of the INSAS rifle family as well as Swedish Bofors Haubits FH77 artillery guns and BM-21 Grad multiple rocket launchers. Indian Air Force planes like SEPECAT Jaguars in bombing roles and helicopters like Mil Mi-17s and HAL Cheetahs were shown in casualty evacuation roles. Pakistani artillery depicted were Indian field guns and 81 mm mortars. SLRs stood in for the G3 rifles used by the Pakistan Army.

Shah Rukh Khan was first offered Sanjay Dutt's role, but things couldn't be worked out. Aamir Khan was the initial choice for Karan Nath's role. Rahul Khanna and Arbaaz Khan were signed for the film, but both walked out later. Jackie Shroff was signed for the film but dropped out later. Salman Khan was the original choice for Abhishek Bachchan's role Mukesh Khanna was signed for the film but was later replaced by Raj Babbar. Danny Denzongpa was signed for the film but later opted-out; Sudesh Berry replaced him later.

Soundtrack
The music of this movie was composed by Anu Malik, with lyrics written by Javed Akhtar. The music was released by Saregama label. According to the Indian trade website Box Office India, with around 15,00,000 units sold, this film's soundtrack album was the year's eighth highest-selling.

List of songs

Critical reception 
Anupama Chopra of India Today called LOC:Kargil "Wasted effort" and wrote "Stretching to more than four hours, the film feels almost as long as the actual conflict." Anita Bora for Rediff.com wrote, "The battle scenes are gruesome, loud and hammer at you, much like the blazing guns in the background. But a lot has gone into making the scenes as realistic as possible. ... The one negative factor is its length. This might deter many from watching the movie. Possibly a slightly edited version, keeping it within 3 hours is called for".

Awards 
49th Filmfare Awards:

Nominated

 Best Director – J. P. Dutta
 Best Supporting Actor – Manoj Bajpayee
 Best Music Director – Anu Malik
 Best Lyricist – Javed Akhtar for "Ek Saathi Aur Bhi Tha"

References

External links
 
 

2003 films
2000s Hindi-language films
Films set in the 1990s
2000s war drama films
Indian war drama films
Films about terrorism in India
Kargil War
War films based on actual events
Films based on Indo-Pakistani wars and conflicts
Films scored by Anu Malik
Indian Army in films
Kashmir conflict in films
Films directed by J. P. Dutta
Indian action war films
Military of Pakistan in films
Indian historical action films
Films set in Kargil
2003 drama films